Junction Oval (also known as the St Kilda Cricket Ground, or the CitiPower Centre due to sponsorship reasons) is a historic sports ground in the suburb of St Kilda in Melbourne, Victoria, Australia. 

The oval's location near the St Kilda Junction gave rise to its name. It is located approximately five kilometres south from the centre of Melbourne and is in the southernmost part of the large Albert Park sporting precinct. The oval is the administrative headquarters of Cricket Victoria, and was redeveloped between 2015 and 2018 for that purpose.

History & Description

Junction Oval was established on its present site in 1856. The first grandstand at the ground was purchased from the old Elsternwick racecourse and erected in 1892 at the southern end of the ground. A new grandstand was built in 1925–6 at a cost of £7000, designed by the architect E J Clark and built by H H Eilenberg. It was originally called the G P Newman Stand but has been renamed the Kevin Murray Stand after one of the Fitzroy Football Club's most famous footballers. A second brick stand designed by E J Clark to complement the Murray Stand was built by H H Eilenberg in 1933–4 at a cost of £7500. It was named the Don Blackie–Bert Ironmonger Stand in honour of the St Kilda Cricket Club and Test cricketers. Both grandstands still stand today and have been recently restored and are in use. A new £6000 manual scoreboard and kiosk at the northern end of the ground was built in 1956–7, the cricket club's centenary year. The scoreboard is a landmark of the St Kilda Junction area. The remainder of the ground is grass embankments, other than the southern practice wicket area. Older structures were demolished during a rationalisation of the ground, after they were declared a fire hazard by the Metropolitan Fire Brigade in 1988. It is a very picturesque venue, with a top-quality turf playing area and a modern backdrop of tall buildings and parkland. The current capacity of the ground is 7,000. 

Cricket great Shane Warne had a long association with the St Kilda Cricket Ground. He made his first class debut at the ground for Victoria in 1991, and played there on numerous occasions between 1989 and 2006 for his club side, St Kilda. In 2010, the club proposed renaming the ground the Shane Warne Oval, but the change never occurred. In 2013, Warne spoke on behalf of the campaign to preserve the ground's suitability as a venue for first-class cricket. 

In December 2014, the Victorian Government announced it would contribute $25 million to the Oval's redevelopment to allow it to become the administrative and training headquarters of Cricket Victoria. By the end of 2015, Cricket Victoria and Cricket Australia, in combination with the Melbourne Cricket Club, contributed the extra $15 million necessary to allow the redevelopment to proceed. The redevelopment of the venue incorporated several new features such as a national centre for cricket training and programs, on-site accommodation for visiting teams and officials, medical and training facilities including an extensive outdoor turf training area and 10-lane indoor centre and administrative facilities and offices to house Cricket Victoria and be rented to external parties. The redevelopment allowed the oval to become a boutique-size alternative venue for first-class cricket with a capacity for up to 7,000 spectators.

The upgraded venue was unveiled ahead of the Sheffield Shield match between Victoria and New South Wales on 3 March 2018. The Melbourne Stars played the first men's Big Bash League match at the venue against the Perth Scorchers on 2 January 2022 as part of their BBL11 Campaign.

Cricket
Junction Oval was founded in tandem with the St Kilda Cricket Club, who have called the ground home since its opening in 1856. The club plays in the Victorian Premier Cricket competition and has a rich history of success at the venue. Prior to the redevelopment in 2015–18, the venue had hosted 28 first-class cricket matches, including 25 Sheffield Shield games. The lack of upgrades to the oval meant that by 2005 the venue failed to meet first-class standards, though in retaining its charm it was compared to the Basin Reserve in Wellington.

The need for a first-class standard cricket ground in Victoria, in addition to the 100,000 seat capacity Melbourne Cricket Ground (MCG), became increasingly apparent as the state team was forced to host Sheffield Shield finals in interstate locations. Consequently, the redevelopment of the ground in the mid-2010s allowed Victoria and other teams to host matches at an appropriately-sized venue, relieving pressure on the MCG and enabling the oval to become capable of hosting Women's Big Bash League matches and other cricket competitions where necessary, as well as being the administrative headquarters of Cricket Victoria. The venue is referred to as the CitiPower Centre. Prior to redevelopment, Victoria utilised the oval during the 2005–06 season when the Melbourne Cricket Ground (MCG) was being prepared for the 2006 Commonwealth Games. In the early 1990s it was used regularly because of the construction of the Great Southern Stand at the MCG. It also played host to the 2008/09 Sheffield Shield final, won by the Bushrangers, due to the unavailability of the MCG, because of the Bushfire relief concert.

The Junction Oval was converted into a full-time cricket venue as of 2015 as part of the redevelopment in 2015 until 2018.

As a result of the redevelopment, the Victorian state team plays many home games in the domestic One-Day Cup and Sheffield Shield competitions at the oval. Success at the redeveloped ground came quickly for the Victorians, who won their sixth One-Day Cup and 32nd Sheffield Shield at the Junction Oval during the 2018–19 season.

Australian rules football
While the redevelopment of Junction Oval ended the 145-year association of Australian rules football with the ground, the venue has a rich football history.

On 28 May 1870, the first ever football match with historical senior premiership status was played at the oval between South Yarra and Albert Park, with Albert Park winning by three goals to one.

After entering senior competition, the St Kilda Football Club played its home matches there in 1874  and 1875, when the club merged with University for one season to form a combined team, St Kilda cum University, due to a lack of players. As St Kilda moved to Alpaca Paddock in 1876 after returning as a standalone team, and lack of players and financial problems meant that St Kilda went into recess during 1879, no further matches would be played there until St Kilda returned to competition in 1886.

St Kilda subsequently played their home games at the venue until 1964 (except for in 1916–17, when the club was in recess due to World War I, and 1942–43, when the military occupied the ground during World War II). Other clubs who used the venue as a home ground included South Melbourne (1944–1946) and Fitzroy (1970–1984), while the first ever women's footy match was played there in 1921.

St Kilda Football Club played 564 home matches for premiership points at the ground between 1897 and 1964. The Saints' final home game at the venue was on 22 August 1964, a 12-point win against Geelong, 12.18 (90) to 11.12 (78), in front of 37,100 fans. The club also played 16 away games at the venue: 13 against the Fitzroy and three against South Melbourne.

Before the 1944 season, the military vacated the Junction Oval, and because it was closer to South Melbourne's still-occupied home ground, the Lake Oval, than Princes Park, the Swans started playing their home games at the venue. The South Melbourne Football Club played 29 home matches for premiership points at the ground between 1944 and 1946.

The St Kilda Football Club left the venue after the 1964 season and moved to Moorabbin Oval, motivated by the desire to operate its own venue.

In 1970, the Fitzroy Football Club relocated to the venue and stayed until the end of 1984. Fitzroy played 135 home matches for premiership points at the ground between 1970 and 1984. Fitzroy were evicted from the venue at the end of 1984 after a fifteen-year tenure, and moved their primary training and administrative base to Northcote Park and their home games to Victoria Park, sharing the venue with Collingwood Football Club. 

The final VFL game to be played at the Junction Oval was between St Kilda Football Club and Fitzroy Football Club in front of a crowd attendance of 15,156 on 1 September 1984 in Round 22 of the 1984: Fitzroy defeated St Kilda by 57 points, 24.20 (164) to St Kilda 15.17 (107).

The ground also hosted six VFL finals matches, including three Grand Finals (in 1898–1899 and 1944, all three being won by Fitzroy). Between 1870 and 1984, 845 senior matches in the recognized top level of Victorian football – 12 in the unaffiliated era, 99 in the VFA and 734 in the VFL/AFL – were played at the ground over 93 seasons of competition.

Junction Oval was also a regular venue for Victorian Football Association finals following the Second World War: it staged every top division VFA finals series, including Grand Finals, from 1945 until 1962, in 1966, and then again from 1970 until 1987. The Sandringham Football Club played home games at the ground during the 1966 season.

The Melbourne Football Club used the venue as a training ground and administrative base between 1985 and 2010, having previously trained at the Melbourne Cricket Ground, and the annual 3RRR Community Cup football match was played there until 2007.

The last football tenant was the Victorian Amateur Football Association's Old Melburnians Football Club from 1992 to 2015, and they took on Old Caulfield Grammarians in the final Australian rules football match to be played at the Junction Oval on 22 July 2015.

Record attendances
The record attendance at the ground is 46,973 on 20 May 1950 to watch St Kilda play Carlton in a VFL match, a bigger crowd than any of the three Grand Finals played at the venue.

The record attendance for a South Melbourne home game at the Junction Oval was 38,000 against Richmond in 1946.

The record attendance for a Fitzroy home game was 27,202 versus Collingwood in the opening round of 1981.

Other sports
On 3 March 1975, one of the greatest heavyweight boxers of all time, "Smokin" Joe Frazier, defeated Jimmy Ellis via technical knockout in the 9th round of their scheduled 12 round fight at the Junction Oval, "to barge squarely back into contention for Muhammad Ali's world heavyweight title." It was the second time Ellis had fought Frazier; Frazier had won their first fight. Other major events that have been held at the ground include the 1898/99 Victorian athletics titles, numerous bicycle meets and two inter-colonial lacrosse matches between Victoria and New South Wales. A pre-season rugby league trial match between Western Suburbs and Manly Warringah was staged at the oval in 1978 notable for being the start of the infamous Fibros vs Silvertails rivalry shared between the two sides.

References

External links

About the Junction Oval – Cricket Victoria

Summary record of all VFL matches at Junction Oval
 History of Fitzroy Football Club, home grounds etc
St Kilda Football Club's reason for moving from Junction Oval
The scoreboard, Junction Oval
"Around the Grounds" – web documentary – Junction Street

Cricket grounds in Victoria (Australia)
Defunct Australian Football League grounds
Sports venues in Melbourne
Heritage-listed buildings in Melbourne
Sports venues completed in 1856
Sydney Swans
Women's Big Bash League
1856 establishments in Australia
St Kilda, Victoria
Sport in the City of Port Phillip
Buildings and structures in the City of Port Phillip
St Kilda Football Club